Mount Neumayer is a mountain (720 m) surmounting D'Urville Wall on the north side of the terminus of David Glacier, in Victoria Land. Discovered by the Discovery expedition, 1901–04, under Scott, who named this feature for Georg von Neumayer, German geophysicist, who was active in organizing Antarctic exploration.

Mountains of Victoria Land
Scott Coast